Soul Crib is an album by organist Charlie Earland which was recorded in 1969 and released on the Choice label. Most of the tracks were reissued on Muse Records in 1977 with three tracks on Smokin' and three on Mama Roots.

Reception

The AllMusic review by Wichael Erlewine simply stated "Earland with George Coleman on tenor sax, Jimmy Ponder on guitar, and Walter Perkins on drums".

Track listing
All compositions by Charles Earland except where noted
 "Soon It's Gonna Rain" (Harvey Schmidt, Tom Jones) – 7:30
 "Strangers in the Night" (Bert Kaempfert, Charles Singleton, Eddie Snyder) – 5:30
 "Old Folks" (Dedette Lee Hill, Willard Robison) – 5:30
 "The Dozens" – 2:50
 "Milestones #2" (Miles Davis) – 3:30
 "Mus' Be LSD" – 6:30
 "Undecided" (Charlie Shavers, Sid Robin) – 6:45

Personnel
Charles Earland – organ
George Coleman – tenor saxophone
Jimmy Ponder – guitar
Walter Perkins  – drums

References

Charles Earland albums
1969 albums
Albums produced by Ozzie Cadena
Albums recorded at Van Gelder Studio